Year 1113 (MCXIII) was a common year starting on Wednesday (link will display the full calendar) of the Julian calendar.

Events 
 By place 

 Byzantine Empire 
 Spring – Siege of Nicaea: Malik Shah, Seljuk ruler of the Sultanate of Rum, sends an expedition through Bithynia to the very walls of Nicaea. Seljuk forces raid Abydos on the Hellespont, with its rich custom-houses. Malik Shah attacks and captures Pergamum. Emperor Alexios I Komnenos sets out to meet the Seljuk invaders. He lifts the siege at Nicaea and wins a complete victory near Cotyaeum (modern Turkey).

 Levant 
 January 15 – The Order of Knights of the Hospital of Saint John of Jerusalem (Knights Hospitaller), founded to protect pilgrims to the Holy Land, is formally recognized by the papal bull (proclamation) Pie Postulatio Voluntatis issued by Pope Paschal II.
 June 28 – Battle of Al-Sannabra: The Crusaders led by Baldwin I are defeated (due to a feigned flight) by a Seljuk army under Mawdud ibn Altuntash, the Turkic governor (atabeg) of Mosul, at the Jordan River south of the Sea of Galilee. Mawdud sends raiding columns to ravage the countryside and sacks the town of Nablus.
 September – King Baldwin I of Jerusalem marries Adelaide del Vasto, the wealthy widow of Count Roger I of Sicily ('Bosso') in Acre. She lands in Palestine accompanied by Arab soldiers (her personal bodyguard) and travels to Jerusalem. Their marriage is bigamous, because Baldwin is legally still married to his second wife Arda of Armenia.

 Europe 
 April 16 – Sviatopolk II, Grand Prince of Kiev, dies after a 20-year reign and is succeeded by his 60-year-old cousin Vladimir II Monomakh. He begins a campaign against the Cumans on the steppe in an effort to reunite the land of Kievan Rus'.
 September 7 – The Republic of Pisa signs a treaty with Ramon Berenguer III ('the Great'), count of Barcelona. The Pisan fleet embarks on a campaign against the Moors in the Balearic Islands.
 The Republic of Florence conquers the neighboring city of Montecascioli, as part of its effort to extend its domination over the contado (provinces of Italy).
 Peter Abelard, a French scholastic philosopher, opens his school in Paris, on the heights of Montagne Sainte-Geneviève (approximate date).
 Queen Urraca of Castile unsuccessfully attempts to seize the city of Burgos from her ex-husband, King Alfonso the Battler.

 Asia 
 A Thousand Li of Rivers and Mountains, the only extant work by the Chinese painter Wang Ximeng, is finished.
 King Suryavarman II begins his reign as ruler of the Khmer Empire (modern Cambodia).

 By topic 

 Religion 
 Bridlington Priory is founded in England, in the Diocese of York (approximate date).

Births 
 January 11 – Wang Chongyang, Chinese Daoist (d. 1170)
 August 24 – Geoffrey Plantagenet, Count of Anjou ("the Fair") (d. 1151)
 Donnchad I, Earl of Fife (Duncan), Scottish nobleman (d. 1154)
 Frederick of Hallum, Frisian priest and abbot (d. 1175)
 Shams-ul-Mulk Isma'il, Seljuk governor (d. 1135)
 Shun'e (or Tayū no Kimi), Japanese poet (d. 1191)
 Stefan Nemanja, Grand Prince of Serbia (d. 1199)
 Walter de Clifford, English nobleman (d. 1190)

Deaths 
 January 5 – Ulrich I, Moravian ruler (House of Přemyslid)
 April 13 – Ida of Lorraine, French countess (b. 1040)
 April 16 – Sviatopolk II, Grand Prince of Kiev (b. 1050)
 August 4 – Gertrude of Saxony, countess of Holland
 October 2 – Mawdud ibn Altuntash, Turkic governor
 December 10 – Fakhr al-Mulk Radwan, Seljuk ruler
 Dharanindravarman I, king of the Khmer Empire
 Girard I (or Guinard), count of Roussillon (b. 1070)
 Ibn Tahir of Caesarea, Arab historian (b. 1056)
 Kyansittha, king of the Pagan Empire (or 1112)
 Liu, Chinese empress of the Song dynasty (b. 1079)
 Nestor the Chronicler, Russian historian (or 1114)
 Odo of Tournai, bishop of Cambrai (b. 1060)
 Syr ibn Abi Bakr, Almoravid military leader 
 Wuyashu, chieftain of the Wanyan tribe (b. 1061)

References